Esri (Environmental Systems Research Institute) is an American multinational geographic information system (GIS) software company. It is best known for its ArcGIS products. With a 43% market share, Esri is the world's leading supplier of GIS software, web GIS and geodatabase management applications. The company is headquartered in Redlands, California.

Founded as the Environmental Systems Research Institute in 1969 as a land-use consulting firm, Esri currently has 49 offices worldwide including 11 research and development centers in the United States, Europe, the Middle East and Africa and Asia Pacific. There are 10 regional U.S. offices and over 3,000 partners globally, with users in every country and a total of over a million active users in 350,000 organizations. These include Fortune 500 companies, most national governments, 20,000 cities, all 50 US States and 7,000+ universities. The firm has 4,000 total employees, and is privately held by its founders. In a 2016 Investor's Business Daily article, Esri's annual revenues were indicated to be $1.1 billion.

The company hosts an annual International User's Conference, which was first held on the Redlands campus in 1981 with 16 attendees. The 43rd User Conference was held in San Diego at the San Diego Convention Center. In 2022, 31,590 users from 142 countries attended either in person or digitally.

Ownership
Jack and Laura Dangermond founded Esri in 1969. Jack Dangermond is the current president.

Esri is a privately held company and debt free.

Products 

Esri uses the name ArcGIS to refer to its suite of GIS software products, which operate on desktop, server, and mobile platforms. ArcGIS also includes developer products and web services. In a general sense, the term GIS describes any information system that integrates, stores, edits, analyzes, shares and displays geographic information for informing decision making. The term GIS-Centric, however, has been specifically defined as the use of the Esri ArcGIS geodatabase as the asset and feature data repository central to computerized maintenance management systems (CMMS) as a part of enterprise asset management and analytical software systems. GIS-centric certification criteria have been specifically defined by NAGCS, the National Association of GIS-Centric Solutions.

Desktop GIS 
As of January 2021, the company's desktop GIS suite is ArcGIS Desktop version 10.8.1 and ArcGIS Pro 2.7. ArcGIS Desktop consists of several integrated applications, including ArcMap, ArcCatalog, ArcToolbox, ArcScene, ArcGlobe, and ArcGIS Pro. The suite's main application today is ArcGIS Pro which is slowly replacing the former main components, ArcMap, ArcCatalog and ArcToolbox. Collectively these applications allow users to author, analyze, map, manage, share, and publish geographic information. ArcGIS Pro was introduced in early 2015 as a modern and fully 64-bit application with integrated 2D and 3D functionality. The product suite is available in three levels of licensing: Basic (formerly called ArcView), Standard (formerly called ArcEditor) and Advanced (formerly called ArcInfo). Basic provides a basic set of GIS capabilities suitable for many GIS applications. Standard, at added cost, allows more extensive data editing and manipulation, including server geodatabase editing.  Advanced, at the high end, provides full, advanced analysis and data management capabilities, including geostatistical and topological analysis tools. Additionally, ArcGIS is compatible with following OGC standards: WFS, WCS, GFS and various others.

ArcGIS Explorer, ArcReader,  and ArcExplorer are basic freeware applications for viewing GIS data.

ArcGIS Desktop extensions are available, including Spatial Analyst for raster analysis, and 3D Analyst for terrain mapping and analysis.  Other more specialized extensions are available from Esri and third parties.

Esri's original product, ARC/INFO, was a command line GIS product available initially on minicomputers, then on UNIX workstations. In 1992, a GUI GIS, ArcView GIS, was introduced. Over time, both products were offered in Windows versions, and ArcView also as a Macintosh product. The names ArcView and ArcInfo were used for a while to name different levels of licensing in ArcGIS Desktop, and less often refer to these original software products. The Windows version of ArcGIS is now the only ArcGIS Desktop platform that is undergoing new development for future product releases.

Server GIS 
Server GIS products provide GIS functionality and data deployed from a central environment. ArcGIS Server is an Internet application service, used to extend the functionality of ArcGIS Desktop software to a browser based environment. It is available on Solaris and Linux as well as Windows. ArcSDE (Spatial Database Engine) is used as a Relational database management system connector for other Esri software to store and retrieve GIS data within a commercially available database: currently, it can be used with Oracle, PostgreSQL, DB2, Informix and Microsoft SQL Server databases. It supports its native SDE binary data format, Oracle Spatial, and ST_geometry.
ArcIMS (Internet Mapping Server) provides browser-based access to GIS. As of ArcGIS 10.1, ArcIMS has been deprecated in favor of ArcGIS Server, but there are still many instances of ArcIMS (10.0 and older) in production environments.
Other server-based products include Geoportal Server, ArcGIS Image Server and Tracking Server as well as several others.

Mobile GIS 
Mobile GIS conflates GIS, GPS, location-based services, hand-held computing, and the growing availability of geographic data. ArcGIS technology can be deployed on a range of mobile systems from lightweight devices to PDAs, laptops, and Tablet PCs. The firm's products for this use include Collector for ArcGIS, Survey123 for ArcGIS, ArcGIS QuickCapture and more. Former products and applications in this category included ArcPad and ArcGIS for Mobile.

Online GIS (ArcGIS Online)
ArcGIS includes Internet capabilities in all Esri software products. The services, provided through ArcGIS Online at www.arcgis.com, include web APIs, hosted map and geoprocessing services, and a user sharing program. A variety of basemaps is a signature feature of ArcGIS Online. The Esri Community Maps program compiles detailed user basemap information into a common cartographic format called Topographic Basemap.

Data formats

Vector
 Shapefile – Esri's proprietary, hybrid vector data format using SHP, SHX and DBF files. Originally invented in the early 1990s, it is still commonly used as a widely supported interchange format.
 Enterprise Geodatabase – Esri's geodatabase format for use in an relational database system.
 File Geodatabase – Esri's file-based geodatabase format, stored as folders in a file system.
 Personal Geodatabase – Esri's closed, integrated vector data storage strategy using Microsoft's Access MDB format is a legacy format generally replaced by the file geodatabase in most contemporary use.
 Coverage – Esri's closed, hybrid vector data storage strategy. Legacy ArcGIS Workstation / ArcInfo format with reduced support in modern application.

Raster 
 Esri grid – binary and metadataless ASCII raster formats.
 Mosaic - data structure for managing and analyzing multidimensional raster and imagery data, including netCDF, GRIB, and Hierarchical Data Format

Esri Technical Certification 
The Esri Technical Certification program was launched in January 2011.  The program provides an exam based certification for Esri software.  The core groups for the certification include Desktop, Developer, and Enterprise.  Each subcategory under these groups have two certification levels, Associate and Professional.

See also
Open Geospatial Consortium
ArcGIS
Smart Data Compression

References

External links

1969 establishments in California
Companies based in San Bernardino County, California
GIS companies
Map companies of the United States
Redlands, California
Remote sensing companies
Software companies based in California
Software companies established in 1969
Software companies of the United States
Technology companies based in Greater Los Angeles
Technology companies established in 1969